Attorney General Smith or Attorney-General Smith may refer to:

A. Hyatt Smith (1814–1892), Attorney General of the Wisconsin Territory 
Albert James Smith (1822–1883), Attorney General of Canada (Acting)
Brian Smith (Canadian politician) (born 1934), Attorney General of British Columbia
Bud Smith (politician) (born 1946), Attorney General of British Columbia
Darrell F. Smith (1927–2013), Attorney General of Arizona
F. E. Smith, 1st Earl of Birkenhead (1872–1930), Attorney General for England and Wales
Francis Smith (Australian politician) (1819–1909), Attorney General of Tasmania
Frederick Smith (barrister) (1924–2016), Attorney-General of Barbados
Frederick Smith (lawyer) (1773–1830), Attorney General of Pennsylvania
George Baldwin Smith (1823–1879), Attorney General of Wisconsin
George Paton Smith (1829–1877), Attorney-General of Victoria, Australia
Godfrey Smith (politician) (fl. 1980s–2000s), Attorney-General of Belize
Greg Smith (New South Wales politician) (born 1947), Attorney General of New South Wales
James C. Smith (politician) (born 1940), Attorney General of Florida
John Smith Walker (1826–1893), interim Attorney General of the Kingdom of Hawaii
Lyndon A. Smith (1854–1918), Attorney General of Minnesota
Thomas Cusack-Smith (1795–1866), Attorney-General for Ireland
William French Smith (1917–1990), Attorney General of the United States
William Owen Smith (1848–1929), Attorney General of the Provisional Government of Hawaii, and of the Republic of Hawaii
William Rudolph Smith (1787–1868), Attorney General of Wisconsin
William Smith (judge, born 1697) (1697–1769), Attorney General of New York
Winfield Smith (1827–1899), Attorney General of Wisconsin

See also
John Lucie-Smith (1825–1883), Attorney General of British Guiana
William Haynes-Smith (1839–1928), Attorney General of British Guiana
Smith McPherson (1848–1915), Attorney General of Iowa
Constantine Joseph Smyth (1859–1924), Attorney General of Nebraska
General Smith (disambiguation)